Martin Laurinc (born 4 January 1978) is a Slovak football player who currently plays for ŠK Tvrdošín.

External links

1978 births
Living people
Slovak footballers
MFK Ružomberok players
FK Dukla Banská Bystrica players
MŠK Žilina players
Czech First League players
SK Dynamo České Budějovice players
Slovak Super Liga players
FK Senica players
MŠK Novohrad Lučenec players
Association football defenders